Holguin-Hernandez v. United States was a United States Supreme Court case. The Court decided that the sentence imposed on the defendant was unconstitutional, in violation of the Eighth Amendment to the United States Constitution, furthermore, the court affirmed the principle that the Federal Sentencing Guidelines were not mandatory.

Case description 
Holguin-Hernandez was convicted of drug charges and sentenced to 60 months in prison and 5 years of supervised release. The government requested that an additional sentence of 12 to 18 months in prison be imposed for violation of the conditions of the previous term. The district court accepted the request and imposed an additional 12-month sentence. The defendant appealed to the United States Court of Appeals for the Fifth Circuit and argued that the sentence was unconstitutional as it was greater than the necessary sentence to accomplish its goals. The Court of Appeals found that he could not argue its unconstitutionality because he didn't argue it before the District Court. Before the Supreme Court of the United States, the court ruled that the sentence imposed was "unreasonably long" and that the Federal Sentencing Guidelines were not mandatory for judges to follow, and that he could argue for its unconstitutionality.

Influence 
The case resulted in the re-affirmation that the Federal Sentencing Guidelines were not mandatory, it also created the principle that sentences couldn't punish over the amount that highly promote justice.
The effects are seen to this day in many lower court cases.

References 

United States Supreme Court cases
2020 in United States case law
United States Supreme Court cases of the Roberts Court
Federal Rules of Criminal Procedure case law